Blaçi is a village in the south of Kosovo, in the municipality of Dragaš, located the Opolje region of the Šar Mountains.

Notable people 
 
 
Hajriz Meleqi (born 1946), professor of geography

Notes

References

Villages in Dragash
Šar Mountains